Allacta australiensis is a species from the genus Allacta.

References

Cockroaches